Adam Marsland is an American singer, songwriter, producer, and multi-instrumentalist.  He is best known as the leader of 1990s power pop band Cockeyed Ghost and later for extensive touring and sideman work.  He was born in Greene, New York, United States.

Music career

Cockeyed Ghost (1994-2001)
Marsland relocated to Los Angeles and formed punk-flavored powerpop band Cockeyed Ghost in 1994.  Along with bands such as The Negro Problem, Baby Lemonade and Wondermints, Marsland and Cockeyed Ghost were part of the popular mid-1990s "pop underground" in Los Angeles and signed to Rykodisc-distributed indie label Big Deal in 1996.  The band's debut album Keep Yourself Amused followed shortly thereafter and was acclaimed by The New York Press as "finest debut album of the rapidly aging year.".  The band was noted for its high energy and work ethic, performing at the SXSW festival  and touring with labelmates Shonen Knife, as well as opening for Fastball, Redd Kross, Third Eye Blind and others.  The band was also featured on the cover of the L.A. Weekly in November 1997, and appeared briefly in the television movie Friends 'Til The End that same year.

Cockeyed Ghost made two further albums for Big Deal, Neverest and the critically acclaimed  The Scapegoat Factory, the release of which coincided with Big Deal's bankruptcy in early 1999.  Cockeyed Ghost released their final album, Ludlow 6:18, in 2001 on Marsland's own Karma Frog label.

First solo releases (2001-2004)
Marsland embarked on a series of coast-to-coast solo tours, performing hundreds of shows a year  and establishing a reputation as a DIY workhorse.  He released his debut solo album, the live CD 232 Days On The Road, in 2002.  The album was produced by Robbie Rist, who also participated in sessions for The Scapegoat Factory.

Chaos Band (2004-2008)
Marsland's album You Don't Know Me was released in 2004 and featured the first appearance of his "Chaos Band", inaugurating a long-running collaboration with soulstress Evie Sands (ex-Cockeyed Ghost guitarist Severo Jornacion also performed with the band until joining the Smithereens in 2006).

With the Chaos Band and Alan Boyd, Marsland released Long Promised Road: Songs of Dennis and Carl Wilson Live in 2007, recorded by Grammy-winning Beach Boys engineer Mark Linett:  a highlight of the album was the only then-currently available version of Dennis Wilson’s 1971 unreleased composition "(Wouldn’t It Be Nice To) Live Again", featuring Sands on lead vocals.

Second solo releases (2008-2017)
Marsland returned to his original music with the compilation album Daylight Kissing Night in 2008.  Marsland followed in 2009 with a 23-track double album, Go West, and six months later with Hello Cleveland, which was recorded on the road in less than 9 hours.  Both Daylight Kissing Night and Go West briefly charted on amazon.com's top 40 best seller list on the strength of a grass-roots push to fans. After a three-year hiatus, he released The Owl And The Full Moon in spring 2013, which was promoted by tours in the US and, for the first time, Europe.  Four years later he released the southeast Asian-influenced Bulé, partly recorded in Bali.

Other notable achievements
Aside from his songwriting, Marsland has an extensive resume as a sideman in various capacities including guitar, keyboards, and vocals.  His more notable credits include 2008 Tony Award Winner Stew/The Negro Problem, members of the Beach Boys, and The Wrecking Crew, Davie Allan, Wondermints, Carnie and Wendy Wilson of Wilson Philips, and many others. He performed on Badfinger vocalist Pete Ham's posthumous 7 Park Avenue album  and was a member of a latter-day incarnation of the Standells as vocalist/guitarist prior to leaving the band in 2011.  That same year he also participated in comeback shows by SST art-punk band Trotsky Icepick and longtime collaborator Evie Sands. His numerous production credits include Beach Boy David Marks' 2016 album Back In The Garage.  He also operates Karma Frog Studio.

Discography

References

External links
 Adam Marsland's Chaos page

Living people
People from Greene, New York
Singer-songwriters from New York (state)
Year of birth missing (living people)